Hassan Khanmohammadi (born March 19, 1977, in Tehran) was an Iranian footballer who played for Persepolis. He joined Persepolis with his teammate and friend in Bahman, Reza Jabbari, in 2000 won 2001–02 Iran Pro League with the club. Khanmohammadi left them in 2005. He was forced to retire after several harsh injuries.

Club career

Club career statistics

Honours

Club
Persepolis
Persian Gulf Pro League (1) : 2001–02

References

1977 births
Living people
Iranian footballers
Persepolis F.C. players
Association football wingers